Ruston Parva is a hamlet in the East Riding of Yorkshire, England. It forms part of the civil parish of Harpham.

In the Domesday Book of 1086 the village is written as Roreston, and in 1066 and 1086 lordship of the manor was held by the Canons of the Church of St John, Beverley.

Evidence of medieval occupation has been recorded in the village though observations of earthworks, indicating ridge and furrow field systems, enclosures and a hollow way. In 1968 ditch remains of a moat were observed at the south of the village. The moat may have been part of Upper House manor house.

Ruston Parva's Grade II* listed Anglican church is dedicated to St Nicholas. It was built in Norman style in 1832 from ashlar and yellow brick, and has a tower supported inside by cast iron pillars. Its two deck pulpit and box pews also probably date from 1832.

Leeds-based band the Kaiser Chiefs originally named themselves Runston Parva after the East Riding of Yorkshire village.

References

External links

"Ruston Parva: Geographical and Historical information from the year 1892 (Bulmer's)", Genuki.org.uk. Retrieved 16 April 2012

Villages in the East Riding of Yorkshire